Revolving Art Incubator (RAI) is a contemporary / alternative art space in Lagos, Nigeria. It is situated in Silverbird Galleria on Victoria Island, Lagos.

History 
Revolving Art Incubator (RAI)  was founded in 2016 by contemporary Nigerian Photographer and Artist Jumoke Sanwo, as an alternative art space for multi-creative engagement and contemporary art discourse.

Artists 
RAI has featured a number of Nigerian-based international artists including Aderemi Adegbite, Babatunde Ogunlade, Akinwande, Chris Ogunlowo, and other emerging contemporary artists.

Exhibitions and shows 
RAI has staged exhibitions with artists working across diverse media. These include:

 Visual Representations: Past and Present
 Artist-At-Work
 Artist Talk
 Salvage Art Therapy Exhibition.
 Power Show II: The God-fathers Are Not to Blame by Ayo Akinwande
 Art + Virtual Reality
 RAI book-drive
 Animate Old Lagos project
 Black Wall Experiment

Revolving Art Incubator also holds outSPOKEN, a fortnightly oral diary of contemporary times through poetry, spoken word, and music.

References

External links 
 Revolving Art Incubator

Victoria Island, Lagos
Cultural venues in Lagos
Arts in Lagos